The Heathen Apostles are a gothic Americana band formed in 2013 by Chopper Franklin and Mather Louth, who perform a mix of western music, with post-punk and gothic rock elements. Two of their albums have been included in "best of the year" lists by Folk N Rock magazine.

Career
Heathen Apostles began when vocalist Mather Louth, formerly of Radio Noir, and guitarist Chopper Franklin, a multi-instrumentalist known for his past with The Cramps and as a key figure in the Gothic Americana genre, met and shared their interest in all things dark and Western. They recruited upright bassist Thomas Lorioux, from the group The Kings of Nuthin’, and violinist Luis Mascaro. 
Heathen Apostles have actively toured the United States and parts of Europe.
In 2019, proceeds from their benefit song "Paradise Lost" went towards victims of the California wildfires.

Discography 
 Boot Hill Hymnal (2013)
 Without A Trace EP (2014)
 Fire to the Fuse (2015)
 Evil Spirits EP (2015)
 Requiem For A Remix (2016)
 Misery and Gin EP (2016)
 Strange Flowers (2017)
 Bloodgrass Vol. I EP (2017)
 Bloodgrass Vol. I & II (2018)
 The Fall EP (2018)
 Born By Lightning EP (2019)
 Dust to Dust (2019)
 Prayers Before The Plague (2020)
 The Goodbye Family EP (2021)
 Bloodgrass Vol. 3 EP (2021)
 Bloodgrass Vol. 3 & 4 (2022)

Collaborations discography 
 The Goodbye Family EP (Sew It Up, Get Outta Dodge, Lake of Fire (instrumental)), produced and mixed by Chopper Franklin, lyrics by Lorin Morgan-Richards, vocals by Mather Louth and music by Heathen Apostles (2021, Ratchet Blade Records).
 Gothic Western Haunt, Single, produced and mixed by Chopper Franklin, lyrics by Lorin Morgan-Richards, vocals by Mather Louth and music by Heathen Apostles (2023, Ratchet Blade Records).

References 

Musical groups established in 2013
Gothic country groups
American country music groups
2013 establishments in the United States